Timothy Lee Reid (born December 19, 1944) is an American actor, comedian and film director best known for his roles in prime time American television programs, such as Venus Flytrap on WKRP in Cincinnati (1978–82), Marcel "Downtown" Brown on Simon & Simon (1983–87), Ray Campbell on Sister, Sister (1994–99) and William Barnett on That '70s Show (2004–06). Reid starred in a CBS series, Frank's Place, as a professor who inherits a Louisiana restaurant. Reid is the founder and president of Legacy Media Institute, a non-profit organization "dedicated to bringing together leading professionals in the film and television industry, outstanding actors, and young men and women who wish to pursue a career in the entertainment media".

Early years
Reid was born in Norfolk, Virginia, and raised in the Crestwood area of Chesapeake, formerly Norfolk County, Virginia. He is the son of  William Lee and Augustine (née Wilkins) Reid. He had experienced segregation growing up in Norfolk, the majority of businesses around him being black-owned. He earned his Bachelor of Business Administration at Norfolk State College in 1968. Reid also became a member of Alpha Phi Alpha fraternity. After graduation, he was hired by Dupont Corporation, where he worked for three years.

Reid's entertainment career also began in 1968. He and insurance salesman Tom Dreesen met at a Junior Chamber of Commerce meeting near Chicago.  They were "put together to promote an anti-drug program in the local schools" and, prompted by a comment from a child, decided to form a comedy team.  The team, later billed as "Tim and Tom", was the first interracial comedy duo. Years later, Reid and Dreesen wrote a book about those years called Tim & Tom: An American Comedy in Black and White (2008), co-written with sports writer Ron Rapoport.

Television acting career
Reid started out on the short-lived The Richard Pryor Show. Reid starred as DJ "Venus Flytrap" on the hit CBS sitcom WKRP in Cincinnati, in what is perhaps his best known TV role. Reid starred as Lieutenant Marcel Proust "Downtown" Brown (episodes 43-127) on the CBS detective series Simon & Simon. In 1988, Reid won an award from Viewers for Quality Television Awards as "Best Actor in a Quality Comedy Series" in Frank's Place. In 1988, the same role earned him an Image Award for "Outstanding Lead Actor in a Comedy Series".

Reid played the adult Mike Hanlon in the 1990 television mini-series adaptation of Stephen King's epic horror novel It. He made an appearance as Sgt. Ray Bennett of the Seacouver Police Department in three first-season episodes of Highlander: The Series. He had a starring role in the series Sister, Sister as Ray Campbell for the entire six-season run. On April 13, 2009, Reid appeared opposite former co-star Tamera Mowry on the short-lived ABC Family series Roommates as Mr. Daniels. Reid had a recurring role on That '70s Show as William Barnett.

Directing
Reid has directed various television programs, as well the 1996 film Once Upon a Time...When We Were Colored, based on a similarly titled memoir by Clifton L. Taulbert. Reid directed and adapted a children's TV show called Bobobobs that aired in the late 1980s. He is the creator of Stop the Madness, an after-school special video in the fight against drugs recorded on December 11, 1985.

New Millennium Studios 
Tim and Daphne Maxwell Reid built New Millennium Studios in 1997.  Located in Petersburg, Virginia, the 57.4-acre site with its 14,850-square-foot sound studio was both the only Black-owned film studio in the United States since the 1930s, but also one of the largest independent film studios outside of Hollywood.

New Millennium Studios was used in dozens of movie and television productions, including scenes from the 2001 film Hearts in Atlantis of the Stephen King book of the same name; parts of 2000's The Contender and elements of Steven Spielberg's 2012 film Lincoln were all shot there. The Reids also produced feature films of their own.

Due to "a lack of incentives in the state" to bring film production to Virginia, the Reids sold the property in March 2015 for $1.475 million to Four Square Property Management LLC, a company formed by Four Square Industrial Constructors, based in Chester, Virginia.

Personal life

In 1966, Reid married Rita Ann Sykes; they divorced on May 9, 1980. They have two children together: Timothy II (born 1968) and Tori Reid (born 1971). On December 4, 1982, he married actress Daphne Maxwell Reid. 

In July 2011, Reid was named to the board of directors of the American Civil War Center at Tredegar Iron Works. On May 10, 2014, Reid received a Virginia Commonwealth University honorary doctorate for his many outstanding and distinguished contributions after he delivered a commencement speech.  

During the 1980s and 1990s, Reid served on the advisory board of the National Student Film Institute. A native Virginian, Reid resides in Glensheallah, Portsmouth, Virginia.

Filmography

References

External links
Tim Reid Productions

'WKRP' vet Reid, standup Dreesen's previous life
An excerpt from Tim & Tom: An American Comedy in Black and White by Tim Reid and Tom Dreesen with Ron Rapoport
Alpha Phi Alpha News.
 

1944 births
Living people
20th-century African-American people
20th-century American comedians
20th-century American male actors
21st-century African-American people
21st-century American comedians
21st-century American male actors
Actors from Norfolk, Virginia
African-American film directors
African-American male actors
African-American male comedians
American male comedians
American male television actors
Film directors from Virginia
Male actors from Virginia
Norfolk State University alumni